is a subprefecture of Hokkaido Prefecture, Japan, located in the western part of the island. The subprefecture takes its name from the Ishikari River, the third longest in Japan, which flows through western Hokkaido and empties into the Sea of Japan in the city of Ishikari. There are 6 cities, three towns, and one village under its jurisdiction. Sapporo is both the capital of Hokkaido Prefecture and Ishikari Subprefecture. Shikotsu-Toya National Park is located in the southern part of the subprefecture, and Shokanbetsu-Teuri-Yagishiri Quasi-National Park in the north.

Etymology
The word Ishikari comes from the Ainu language, and several theories exist as to the meaning of the name.
The most common translation of "Ishikari", proposed by the missionary and researcher of the Ainu language John Batchelor (1854 – 1944) in 1935, is "a greatly wandering river", a reference to the meandering path of the Ishikari River. According to Batchelor Ishikari is a corruption of "i-sikar-pet" or "ishikaripet". The 'i' sound of i-sikar-pet is a prefix meaning "greatly" or "exceedingly"; shikari meaning "zigzag" or "serpentine", and pet is the Ainu word for river.
Tōgo Yoshida (1864 – 1918), proposed in the Dai Nihon Chimei Jisho, published between 1907 and 1910, that "Ishikaripet" had its origin in the Ainu language word "Ishikarapet", meaning "a beautifully formed river"; ishu meaning "beautiful", kara meaning "constructed" and pet meaning river.

"Ishikari" is written in the Japanese language using ateji, or kanji characters used to phonetically represent native or borrowed words. The first, means to "stone", and the second, means "to hunt". The meaning of the written form of Ishikari has no relationship to the meaning of word in the Ainu language.

Geography

Municipalities

Mergers

History 
1897: Sapporo Subprefecture established.
1922: Renamed Ishikari Subprefecture.
1996: Hiroshima Town becomes Kitahiroshima City, dissolving Sapporo District.

Transportation

Ishikari Prefecture has two airports, both serving the greater Sapporo area.
 Okadama Airport (Domestic)
 New Chitose Airport (International) (Located in the city of Chitose)

References

External links
 Official website 

Subprefectures in Hokkaido